Columbia blue is a light blue color named after Columbia University. The color itself derives from the official hue of the Philolexian Society, the university's oldest student organization. Although Columbia blue is often identified with Pantone 292, the Philolexian Society first used it in the early 19th century, before the standardization of colors. Pantone 290, a slightly lighter shade of blue, has also been specified by some Columbia University offices, and is the current official color listed by the Columbia University visual communications office. Several other shades are also used by parts of the university in an official capacity.

The color has been adopted by several fraternities and sororities across the United States, as well as by numerous secondary schools and other colleges and universities, including Johns Hopkins University. It has also been used as the official color of a number of sports teams, including the Houston Oilers, the Buffalo Braves, and the Tampa Bay Rays.

History 

Columbia blue derives from the official colors of the Philolexian Society, which was founded at Columbia in 1802. Members of the society have been reported to have worn blue satin rosettes and silver tassels as part of their academic regalia, while members of the rival Peithologian Society would wear white rosettes and gold tassels. The color was first combined with white to represent the university in 1852, during a joint event between the two societies. Both parties wishing to be represented in the promotion of the event, and having decided that using all four colors would be excessive, they picked the color scheme of blue and white, the former borrowed from the Philolexian Society, and the latter from the Peithologian. The two colors were quickly adopted by students to represent the College. According to John Howard Van Amringe, the first entered official use during a boat race in 1873.

Tones 
In a 2009 publication, the university officially lists Columbia blue as Pantone 290, though a darker shade, such as Pantone 294, may still be called Columbia blue when used on a light background. "Secondary Blues" used by the university include Pantone 284, 285, 286, and 280, while the Columbia University Irving Medical Center uses Pantone 7686 and 3005. In one of the first attempts at standardization, the university's athletics department declared Columbia blue to be Pantone 292 in 1999, though, as of 2016, the Columbia Lions actually use Pantone 291. However, Pantone 292 still remains a popular byword for Columbia blue and the university as a whole.

Usage

Fraternities and sororities 
Organizations, fraternities and sororities that use Columbia blue for their colors: 

 Delta Phi
 Acacia
 Lambda Kappa Sigma
 Philolexian Society
 Eta Chi Gamma of New York Institute of Technology

Colleges and universities 
 Columbia Basin College
 Columbia University
 Delaware State University
 Johns Hopkins University
 Lewis–Clark State College
 Livingstone College
 Moorpark College
 Richard Stockton College
 Southern University and A&M College
 Sonoma State University
 Spelman College
 Stockton University
 University of Dayton (until 1994)
 University of San Diego
 Warner Pacific College

Secondary schools 

Columbia blue is used as one of the two or three color symbols for the following colleges, universities and high schools:

Sports 

 The Buffalo Braves, now Los Angeles Clippers
 The Denver Nuggets have worn Columbia blue road jerseys since the 2003–04 NBA season.
 The Kansas Jayhawks football team used Columbia blue in the early 1960s and wore Columbia blue in an October 2011 homecoming football game against the Texas Tech Red Raiders to honor their 1961 Bluebonnet Bowl champions.
 The Kansas City Royals "powder blue" uniforms that debuted in 2008 are actually Columbia blue.
 The Louisiana Tech Lady Techsters basketball team wears their traditional Columbia blue jerseys instead of the university's official color Reflex blue.
 The Memphis Grizzlies introduced an alternate Columbia blue road jersey in 2009, which is actually "smoke blue."
 The Tampa Bay Rays selected Columbia blue as one of its three color symbols in September 2007. The color is used in the team's logos, uniforms and official merchandise.
 The Houston Oilers used Columbia blue in their color scheme throughout their entire franchise history from 1960 to 1996. The Oilers moved to Tennessee in 1997 to become the Tennessee Oilers, and in 1999 would change their names and uniforms to become the present-day Tennessee Titans, including a switch to the slightly darker "Titans Blue".
 The Tennessee Lady Volunteers basketball team wears Columbia blue accents on their uniforms.
 The Utah Jazz wore Columbia blue alternate road jerseys from 2006 to 2010.

See also 

 List of colors

References 

Shades of azure
Shades of blue
School colors
Culture of Columbia University